Marine VHF radio is a worldwide system of two way radio transceivers on ships and watercraft used for bidirectional voice communication from ship-to-ship, ship-to-shore (for example with harbormasters), and in certain circumstances ship-to-aircraft. It uses FM channels in the very high frequency (VHF) radio band in the frequency range between 156 and 174 MHz, inclusive, designated by the International Telecommunication Union as the VHF maritime mobile band. In some countries additional channels are used, such as the L and F channels for leisure and fishing vessels in the Nordic countries (at 155.5–155.825 MHz).

Marine VHF radio equipment is installed on all large ships and most seagoing small craft. It is also used, with slightly different regulation, on rivers and lakes. It is used for a wide variety of purposes, including marine navigation and traffic control, summoning rescue services and communicating with harbours, locks, bridges and marinas.

Background
Marine radio was the first commercial application of radio technology, allowing ships to keep in touch with shore and other ships, and send out a distress call for rescue in case of emergency.  Guglielmo Marconi invented radio communication in the 1890s, and the Marconi Company installed wireless telegraphy stations on ships beginning around 1900.  Marconi built a string of shore stations and in 1904 established the first Morse code distress call, the letters CQD, used until 1906 when SOS was agreed on. The first significant marine rescue due to radio was the 1909 sinking of the luxury liner RMS Republic, in which 1,500 lives were saved.  This and the 1912 RMS Titanic rescue brought the field of marine radio to public consciousness, and marine radio operators were regarded as heroes.  By 1920, the US had a string of 12 coastal stations stretched along the Atlantic seaboard from Bar Harbor, Maine to Cape May, New Jersey.

The first marine radio transmitters used the longwave bands.   During World War I amplitude modulation was developed, and in the 1920s spark radiotelegraphy equipment was replaced by vacuum tube radiotelephony allowing voice communication.  Also in the 1920s,  the ionospheric skip or skywave phenomenon was discovered, which allowed lower power vacuum tube transmitters operating in the shortwave bands to communicate at long distances.

Hoping to foil German detection during the World War II Battle of the Atlantic, American and British convoy escorts used Talk-Between-Ships (TBS) radios operating on VHF.

Types of equipment
Sets can be fixed or portable. A fixed set generally has the advantages of a more reliable power source, higher transmit power, a larger and more effective antenna and a bigger display and buttons. A portable set (often essentially a waterproof, VHF walkie-talkie in design) can be carried on a kayak, or to a lifeboat in an emergency, has its own power source and is waterproof if GMDSS-approved. A few portable VHFs are even approved to be used as emergency radios in environments requiring intrinsically safe equipment (e.g.  gas tankers, oil rigs, etc.).

Voice-only
Voice only equipment is the traditional type, which relies totally on the human voice for calling and communicating.
Many lower priced handheld units are voice only as well as older fixed units.

Digital selective calling

DSC equipment, a part of the Global Maritime Distress Safety System (GMDSS), provides all the functionality of voice-only equipment and, additionally, allows several other features:
 The ability to call another vessel using a unique identifier known as a Maritime Mobile Service Identity (MMSI). This information is carried digitally and the receiving set will alert the operator of an incoming call once its own MMSI is detected. Calls are set up on the dedicated VHF channel 70 which DSC equipment must listen on continuously. The actual voice communication then takes place on a different channel specified by the caller.
 A distress button, which automatically sends a digital distress signal identifying the calling vessel and the nature of the emergency
 A built in GPS receiver or facility to connect an external GPS receiver so that the user's location may be transmitted automatically along with a distress call.

When a DSC radio is bought new the user will get the opportunity to program it with the MMSI number of the ship it is intended to be used on. However to change the MMSI after the initial programming can be problematic and require special proprietary tools. This is allegedly done to prevent theft.

Automatic identification system

More advanced transceiver units support AIS. This relies on a GPS receiver built into the VHF equipment or an externally connected one by which the transceiver obtains its position and transmits this information along with some other details about the ship (MMSI, cargo, draught, destination and some others) to nearby ships. AIS operates as a mesh network and full featured units relay AIS messages from other ships, greatly extending the range of this system; however some low-end units are receive only or do not support the relaying functionality.

AIS data is carried on dedicated VHF channels 87B and 88B at a baud rate of 9,600bit/s using GMSK modulation and uses a form of time-division multiplexing.

Text messaging
Using the RTCM 12301.1 standard it is possible to send and receive text messages in a similar fashion to SMS between marine VHF transceivers which comply with this standard. However, as of 2019 very few transceivers support this feature. The recipient of the message needs to be tuned to the same channel as the transmitting station in order to receive it.

Regulation
In the United States, any person can legally purchase a Marine VHF radio and use it to communicate without requiring any special license as long as they abide by certain rules, but in a great many other countries a license is required to transmit on Marine VHF frequencies.

In the United Kingdom and Ireland and some other European countries Short Range Certificate is the minimum requirement to use a marine VHF radio. This is usually obtained after completing a course of around two days and passing an exam. This is intended for those operating on lakes and in coastal areas whereas a Long Range Certificate is usually recommended for those operating further out as it also covers HF and MF radios as well as INMARSAT systems.

Automatic Transmitter Identification System (marine)
For use on the inland waterways within continental Europe, a compulsory Automatic Transmitter Identification System (ATIS) transmission conveys the vessel's identity after each voice transmission. This is a ten-digit code that is either an encoded version of the ship's alphanumeric call sign, or for vessels from outside the region, the ship MMSI prefixed with "9".  The requirement to use ATIS in Europe, and which VHF channels may be used, are strongly regulated, most recently by the Basel agreements.

Channels and frequencies
A marine VHF set is a combined transmitter and receiver and only operates on standard, international frequencies known as channels. Channel 16 (156.8 MHz) is the international calling and distress channel. Frequency modulation (FM) is used, with vertical polarization, meaning that antennas have to be vertical in order to have good reception. For longer range communication at sea, marine MF and marine HF bands and satellite phones can be used.

Half-duplex channels here are listed with the A and B frequencies the same. The frequencies, channels, and some of their purposes are governed by the ITU. For an authoritative list see. The original allocation of channels consisted of only channels 1 to 28 with 50 kHz spacing between channels, and the second frequency for full-duplex operation 4.6 MHz higher.

Improvements in radio technology later meant that the channel spacing could be reduced to 25 kHz with channels 60 to 88 interspersed between the original channels.

Channels 75 and 76 are omitted as they are either side of the calling and distress channel 16, acting as guard channels. The frequencies which would have been the second frequencies on half-duplex channels are not used for marine purposes and can be used for other purposes that vary by country. For example,  161.000 to 161.450 MHz are part of the allocation to the  Association of American Railroads channels used by railways in the US and Canada.

Operating procedure
Marine VHF mostly uses  half-duplex non-relayed transmission. Ship to ship communication is over a single radio frequency, while ship to shore uses two frequencies, but typically only one of the parties can transmit at a time. (Not to be confused with simplex communication, for example radio broadcasting, where one party transmits always transmits.) The transceiver is normally in receive mode; to transmit the user presses a "push to talk" button on the set or microphone which turns the transmitter on and the receiver off. Some channels, however, are "duplex" transmission channels where communication can take place in both directions simultaneously when the equipment on both ends allow it. Each full-duplex channel has two frequency assignments. Duplex channels can be used to place calls over the public telephone network for a fee via a marine operator. When full-duplex is used, the call is similar to one using a mobile phone or landline. When half-duplex is used, voice is only carried one way at a time and the party on the boat must press the transmit button only when speaking. This facility is still available in some areas, though its use has largely died out with the advent of mobile and satellite phones. Marine VHF radios can also receive weather radio broadcasts, where they are available.

The accepted conventions for use of marine radio are collectively termed "proper operating procedure". These  international conventions include:
 Stations should listen for 30 seconds before transmitting and not interrupt other stations.
 Maintaining a watch listening on Channel 16 when not otherwise using the radio. All calls are established on channel 16, except for distress working switch to a working ship-to-ship or ship-to-shore channel. (procedure varies in the U.S. only when calls can be established on Ch. 9)
 During distress operations silence maintained on ch. 16 for other traffic until the channel is released by the controlling station using the pro-word "Silence Fini". If a station does use Ch. 16 during distress operations controlling station issues the command "silence mayday".
 Using a set of international "calling" procedures such as the "Mayday" distress call, the "Pan-pan" urgency call and "Sécurité" navigational hazard call.
 Using "pro-words" based on the English language such as Acknowledge, All after, All before, All stations, Confirm, Correct, Correction, In figures, In letters, Over, Out, Radio check, Read back, Received, Say again, Spell, Standby, Station calling, This is, Wait, Word after, Word before, Wrong (local language is used for some of these, when talking to local stations)
 Using the NATO phonetic alphabet: Alfa, Bravo, Charlie, Delta, Echo, Foxtrot, Golf, Hotel, India, Juliett, Kilo, Lima, Mike, November, Oscar, Papa, Quebec, Romeo, Sierra, Tango, Uniform, Victor, Whiskey, X-ray, Yankee, Zulu
 Using a phonetic numbering system based on the English language or a combination of English and Roman languages: Wun, Too, Tree, Fow-er, Fife, Six, Sev-en, Ait, Nin-er, Zero, Decimal; alternatively in marine communication: unaone, bissotwo, terrathree, kartefour, pantafive, soxisix, setteseven, oktoeight, novenine, nadazero

Slightly adjusted regulations can apply for inland shipping, such as the Basel rules (:de:Regionale Vereinbarung über den Binnenschifffahrtsfunk) in Western Europe.

See also
 2182 kHz
 Automated Maritime Telecommunications System
 Maritime mobile amateur radio
 Radio horizon
 Ship-to-shore

References

External links

US Coast Guard basic radio information for boaters
Coast Guard marine channel listing (with frequencies)
US FCC marine channel listing (by function)
UK MCA advice on use of VHF at sea, including collision avoidance, effective ranges, and International channel usage*
Canadian VHF Bands in the Maritime Service
VHF marine band plan in Turkey (Türkiye'deki VHF Deniz Telsiz Frekans Kanal Listesi)
New Zealand VHF Radio Resource Center

Navigational equipment
Maritime communication
Rescue equipment
Marine electronics

fr:Bandes marines#Bande VHF